Events from the year 1924 in Sweden

Incumbents
 Monarch – Gustaf V
 Prime Minister – Ernst Trygger, Hjalmar Branting

Births

 1 January – Lennart Magnusson, fencer (died 2011).
 7 March – Sven Hjertsson, footballer (died 1999).
 29 June – Eivor Alm, cross-country skier (died 2011).
 15 August – Petrus Kastenman, equestrian (died 2013).
 5 November – Ingrid Sandahl, gymnast (died 2011).

Deaths
 27 February - Carolina Östberg, opera singer  (born 1853)  
 28 February - Hanna Ouchterlony, Salvationist  (born 1838)
 13 may - Wilhelmine Schröder, royal favorite  (born 1839)
 21 December - Anna Hierta-Retzius, women's right activist (born 1841)

References

 
1920 in Sweden
Years of the 20th century in Sweden
Sweden
Sweden